Elles is a surname, and may refer to:

Bertram Walter Elles (1877–1963), British colonial civil servant
Diana Elles, Baroness Elles (1921–2009), British lawyer and peer
Sir Edmond Elles (1848–1934), British Army lieutenant general
Gertrude Elles (1872–1960), British geologist
Sir Hugh Elles (1880–1945), British Army lieutenant general, son of Sir Edmond Elles
James Elles (born 1949), British politician
Wilma Elles (born 1986), German actress

See also
 Elles (film), a French film from 2011
 Women (1997 film), a 1997 film
Ellis
 Elles, an 1896 lithographic portfolio by Henri de Toulouse-Lautrec
 Elles, one of the French personal pronouns
 Elles, the plural for Elle (Spanish pronoun)